Akshay Chauhan (born 17 August 1990) is an Indian first-class cricketer who plays for Himachal Pradesh.

References

External links
 

1990 births
Living people
Indian cricketers
Himachal Pradesh cricketers
Cricketers from Himachal Pradesh